Chongqing University of Posts and Telecommunications (abbreviation: CQUPT) is a public university in China's fourth largest municipality: Chongqing. It focuses on the research and education in the field of information and communications and enjoys nationwide reputation in the study of postal communications, telecommunications and information technology, especially for its research and commercialization in 3G mobile technologies, optical sciences and related digital research. It is one of the four universities of Posts and Telecommunications in China and the only one of its kind in the Southwest China. It enjoys a good reputation in the ICT industry in China due to its high-quality education and research and the large number of alumni working in the ICT industry. Due to its achievements and contributions in the field of information and communications technology, especially in the development of China's own digital communications systems, CQUPT is considered as the cradle of China's digital communications.

History

CQUPT was founded in 1950 along with the foundation of the People's Republic of China and the communist takeover of Chongqing. It was initially founded in the name of Chongqing Institute of Posts and Telecommunications. In 1965, it was entitled to have postgraduate programs as one of the first 10 colleges that had the right to have such programs in the then Sichuan Province (Chongqing separated from Sichuan province as a Municipality in 1997).

In 2000, under the university system reform in China, the university became co-governed and co-financed by the Chinese Central Government with the Chongqing government. In 2006, CQUPT contracted with MIIT (Ministry of Industry and Information Technology of China) to become one of the universities supported by the central government ministry and the municipality government.

Schools
CQUPT has 15 schools and institutes with the Chongqing International Institute of Semiconductors established in 2010.

School of Communications and Information Engineering
Communication Engineering
Telecommunication Engineering
Information Engineering
Radio and Television Engineering
School of Computer Science and Technology
Computer Science and Technology
Network Engineering
Information Security
AI tech
Geographic Information System
School of Automation
Automation
Measurement and Control Technology and Instrumentation
Electrical Engineering and Automation
Mechanical design and Automation
Internet of Things Engineering
School of Optoelectronic Engineering
School of Bioinformatics
School of Mathematics and Physics
School of Software Engineering (CQUPT-HP Software School)
School of Economics and Management
School of Arts and Communication
CQUPT Law School
CQUPT International School
School of Foreign Languages
School of Continuing Education
School of Physical Education
Chongqing International Institute of Semiconductor

A list of schools at CQUPT and the academic programs each offer can be found at the webpage 'School Navigation' from CQUPT's website.

Research

Overview

CQUPT is the origin of the China's digital communications systems. In the very recent years, over 600 scientific projects in the ICT field have been done in the university and 80 of them were granted the "Scientific Research Achievement Awards" by the government. CQUPT is the only Chinese university participating in the development of China's own 3G standard: TD-SCDMA.

The world's first TD-SCDMA chip and mobile phone were developed at CQUPT. The university played a key role in the establishment of China's first national "EPA Communication Standard for Industrial Measurement and Control System", which was recognized by the IEC as international standard in the field of industrial automation. The university's spin-off company Chongqing CYIT Communications Technologies Company (CYIT) is among the first companies doing research on TD-SCDMA and TD-LTE in China and is already a frontrunner in the field nowadays.

The university's strength also lies in areas such as computer science, automatic control technology, microtechnologies, and others, as one of the first academic institutions doing research in these fields in China.

Research at CQUPT is done in about 30 research platforms. Each of the research platforms may contain several laboratories or research groups. Research at CQUPT is closely linked to the industry. In 2010, the Chongqing International Institute of Semiconductor, which is in and hosted by CQUPT, was founded with the participating of nearly 50 partners in industry from around the world, including Qualcomm in USA, Eplida in Japan, the International Association of Semiconductor Equipment and Materials European Microelectronics Center in Taiwan among others. The research at CQUPT is widely done in cooperation with other academic or industrial partners in the form of joint research centers or laboratory.

Academic institutions which have founded joint research centers with CQUPT include the Chinese Science Academy (CSA), the Nanyang Technological University (NTU) in Singapore, Essex University in UK, Inha University in South Korea, etc. The university's industrial partners, which have founded joint research centers or laboratories include Oracle, Cisco, Lenovo Mobile, Maipu Communications, and others.

The university boasts 11 Key Disciplines of ministry and provincial level, and 16 key laboratories, engineering research centres and humanities and social science bases.

Main research bases

Nation Defense Mobilization center of 3G dual-use terminal equipment" (military-civilian alliance), under National Development and Reform Commission.
Mobile Communication Nation together with Local Engineering Research Center, under National Development and Reform Commission.
Mobile Communication National High-tech Base Innovation Platform, under National Development and Reform Commission.
Industrial Automation Tech National High-tech Base Innovation Platform, under National Development and Reform Commission.
National Accessible Information Engineering Research Center, under MIIT.
China National Information Security Application Base, under Chinese Academy of Social Sciences.
Engineering research center of mobile communication, under the Ministry of Education
Key laboratory of networked control and intelligent instrument and meter, under the Ministry of Education
Key laboratory of mobile communication, under the Ministry of Information Industry and Chongqing Municipal Government
Key laboratory of computer network and communication technology, under the Ministry of Information Industry and Chongqing Municipal Government
Key laboratory of fiber-optic communication technology, under the Ministry of Information Industry and Chongqing Municipal Government
Key laboratory of postal automation technology, under the Ministry of Information Industry
"R&D center of Chongqing industrial communication technology", co-founded with Shenyang Institute of Automation, Chinese Academy of Sciences
"Silian-CQUPT joint R&D center", co-founded with China Silian Group
Key laboratory of signal and information processing, under Chongqing Municipal Government
Laboratory of industrial automation technology, under Chongqing Municipal Government
Chongqing Laboratory of Internet and Information Security, under Chongqing Municipal Government
Engineering research center of mobile communication, under Chongqing Municipal Government
Key laboratory of micro-electronic engineering, under Chongqing Municipal Government
Engineering technology research center of intelligent instrument and control device, under Chongqing Municipal Government
Key laboratory of network control technology and intelligent instrument and meter, under Chongqing Municipal Government
Key laboratory of e-commerce and modern logistics, under Chongqing Municipal Government
Engineering research center of automotive electronics and embedded system in universities, under Chongqing Municipal Government
R&D center of industrial communication, under Chongqing Municipal Government

'Research Institutions' on CQUPT's website offers a complete list of research platforms and research institutions at CQUPT.

Students and alumni

Over the 60 years since the establishment of university in 1950, CQUPT has educated over 70,000 students in the field of Information and Communication, many of whom are in the high positions of China's telecommunications companies. The university is deemed as the cradle of talents of ICT industry in China. It boasts its high employment rate among Chinese universities.

Even though the university is featured with excellence in the area of Information and Communications, it is striving to offer a wide range of other subjects including science, engineering, economics, management, arts and education, most of which are related to applied science and engineering. The university offers 45 undergraduate programs, 37 postgraduate programs and Master of Engineering programs; it was also authorized to confer doctor's degrees in the disciplines of Information and Communication Engineering, Computer Science and Technology, Electronic Science and Technology, Control Science and Engineering, Management and Engineering.

CQUPT has about 20,000 students, including more than 3,000 postgraduates.

Partnerships

CQUPT has established good cooperative relations and links with over 30 prestigious universities in USA, Russia, UK, Italy, Canada, Korea, Singapore and so forth.

Some examples of joint research centers co-founded with other academic institutions out of China include the Joint Research Center of 4G Mobile Communications co-founded with Nanyang Technological University (NTU) in Singapore, the Sino-Korean Institute of Spatial Information Systems founded with Inha University and Seowon University in South Korea, the Sino-Europe Joint Laboratory for Intelligent Systems and Robotics with the Essex University and Open University in UK.

Research at CQUPT is also widely collaborated with famous companies in the industry. Many companies found joint laboratories or centers with CQUPT such as Oracle (CQUPT-Oracle Joint Laboratory of Database Technology), Lenovo Mobile (CQUPT-Lenovo Moile Internet Application Research Center), Cisco (CQUPT-Cisco Joint R&D Center of Green Technology). In July, 2010, the School of Computer Science and Technology signed a collaboration contract with Cornell University and founded the CU-CQUPT Joint Lab of Intelligent Computing. Other education or research partners include IBM, Ericsson, Lenovo Mobile, Nokia, China Silian Group, Maipu Communications, Foxconn Technology, ProMOS Technologies and many others. To deepen the relationship with local industry, the university also establishes a good relationship with the local high-tech industry parks like Chongqing Liangjiang New Area, Chongqing Xiyong Microelectronics Industrial Park and Chayuan Industrial Park.

Board
In 2010, the university founded the university board. The board of the university include China Telecom, China Mobile, China Unicom, China Post, Huawei, ZTE, DaTang, China Putian, Lenovo and other industry partners.

References

External links 
CQUPT website (in English)
 CQUPT website (in Chinese)
Introduction of CQUPT (in Chinese)
Research platforms in CQUPT (in Chinese)
Virtual Campus
 CQUPT BBS

Universities and colleges in Chongqing
Educational institutions established in 1950
Telecommunications organizations
Telecommunications in China
1950 establishments in China
Telecommunication education
Nan'an District